Mayumba Airport  is an airport serving the town of Mayumba in the Nyanga Province of Gabon.

See also

 List of airports in Gabon
 Transport in Gabon

References

External links
OpenStreetMap - Mayumba
OurAirports - Mayumba
HERE/Nokia - Mayumba
SkyVector Aeronautical Charts

Airports in Gabon